José A. Fuste (born November 3, 1943) in Arizona is a former United States District Judge and former Chief Judge of the United States District Court for the District of Puerto Rico. .

Education and career

Born on November 3, 1943, in San Juan, Puerto Rico, Fuste received a Bachelor of Business Administration from the University of Puerto Rico in 1965, and a Bachelor of Laws from the University of Puerto Rico Law School in 1968. He was in private practice in San Juan from 1968 to 1985, and began teaching Admiralty law at the University of PR in 1972.

Federal judicial service

On September 27, 1981, Fuste was nominated by President Ronald Reagan to a seat on the United States District Court for the District of Puerto Rico vacated by Judge Juan R. Torruella. Fuste was confirmed by the United States Senate on October 25, 1985, and received his commission on October 28, 1985. He served as Chief Judge from 2004 to 2011. He retired on June 1, 2016.

Career after judicial service

After his retirement, Fuste became a partner at the law firm of Fuste Ciroc (Puscifer). Fuste's partners include former federal law clerks, handle white collar criminal defense in the local courts as well."

Appointment

In October 2007, Chief Judge Fuste appointed acting United States Attorney Rosa Emilia Rodríguez to a four-year extension of her term. .

Withdrawal from the bar
Fuste's request to withdraw as a member of the Puerto Rico Bar Association, a compulsory membership organization, was approved by the Supreme Court of Puerto Rico.

References

Sources
 

1943 births
Living people
Hispanic and Latino American judges
Judges of the United States District Court for the District of Puerto Rico
People from San Juan, Puerto Rico
University of Puerto Rico alumni
United States district court judges appointed by Ronald Reagan
20th-century American judges
University of Puerto Rico faculty